Manulea (Setema) cereola is a moth of the family Erebidae. It is found in Fennoscandia, the Baltic States, European Russia as well as the Alps and Urals. The species was first described by Jacob Hübner in 1803.

The wingspan is 18–32 mm.

The larvae feed on various lichen species from the genus Parmelia.

References

External links
Norwegian Moths
Eilema cereola at Lepiforum e.V.

Moths described in 1803
Lithosiina
Moths of Europe
Taxa named by Jacob Hübner